Trnovlje is a Slovene place name that may refer to:

Settlements
Trnovlje pri Celju, a village in the City Municipality of Celje, central-eastern Slovenia
Trnovlje pri Socki, a village in the Municipality of Vojnik, northeastern Slovenia
Trnovlje, a former name of Cerklje na Gorenjskem
Trnovlje (local community), a local community of Celje